Ardino Municipality is a municipality in Kardzhali Province, Bulgaria. It includes the town of Ardino and  51 nearby villages.

Demographics
As of December 2018, the municipality of Ardino has 12,792 inhabitants. Only 4,002 inhabitants live in the town of Ardino and the remainder in one of the 51 villages.

The following table represents the change of the population in the province after World War II: 

The municipality of Ardino has lost more than two thirds of its population in a period of seventy years.

Vital statistics
The municipality of Ardino recorded just 66 birth, down from 132 in 2000. At the same time there were 193 deaths, up from 168 deaths in 2000. Demographic trends in the municipality of Ardino have largely been unfavourable.

Ethnic composition
A majority of the population consists of ethnic Bulgarian Turks (71.2%). Ethnic Bulgarians make up around 26.9% of the population. Most of those Bulgarians are Pomaks.

Religion
According to the latest Bulgarian census of 2011, the religious composition, among those who answered the optional question on religious identification, was the following: 

Both ethnic Turks and Bulgarians are predominantly Islamic by faith.

References 

Municipalities in Kardzhali Province